The 2002 Ibero-American Championships in Athletics (Spanish: X Campeonato Iberoamericano de Atletismo) was the tenth edition of the international athletics competition between Ibero-American nations which was held at the Estadio Cementos Progreso in Ciudad de Guatemala, Guatemala on 11 and 12 May. A total of 328 athletes participated in the 44-event programme. The 3000 metres was introduced for both men and women, replacing the longer 10,000 metres event.

Following on from the success of the 2001 Central American and Caribbean Championships in Athletics and 2001 Central American Games, Guatemala hosted the Ibero-American Championships for the first time. The competition was a factor for selection for the Americas team in the 2002 IAAF World Cup. Cuba, Spain and Portugal all sent small delegations to the competition, which was held at an altitude of 1402 m – a factor which raised performances in the sprints and jumps.

Brazil topped the medal table for the second time running, taking 38 medals (15 of them gold) from the events. Despite its reduced numbers, Cuba placed second as its athletes won eight events and 16 medals overall. Mexico had the next highest number of event winners, with five gold medallists, while Colombia had the third highest medal haul (13). Fifteen of the 21 nations present reached the medal table.

Six new championship records were set at the competition. Maurren Maggi cleared a record of 6.97 m to win the long jump, while Isbel Luaces's javelin throw of 81.64 m bettered the championship record. Vânia Silva improved the women's hammer throw mark by several metres. Uruguay's Heber Viera and Brazil's Vicente de Lima needed a photo finish to separate them in the 100 metres. The Uruguayan took the honours by 2/1000 of a second – a difference which may have been made by de Lima's premature celebration before the line. Viera went on take the 200 metres silver in a Uruguayan record time.

Former Olympic champion Jefferson Pérez was present for the men's racewalk and won by half a minute. Hudson de Souza defended his 800/1500 metres double from the 2000 edition. Others to defend their titles were Alejandra García in the women's pole vault, Felipa Palacios in the 200 m and Gilmar Mayo in the men's high jump.

Medal summary

Men

† Note: The results for the men's high jump listed by GBR Athletics conflict with those of the official report. Javier Bermejo (ESP) and Jessé de Lima (BRA) are listed as joint silver medallists, but Bermejo came third on countback.
‡ Note: The results for the men's pole vault listed by GBR Athletics conflict with those of the official report. José Francisco Nava (CHI) and Edgar León (MEX) are listed as joint silver medallists, but the athletes were third and fourth, respectively, on countback.

Women

† Note: The results for the women's pole vault listed by GBR Athletics conflict with those of the official report. Puerto Rico's Michelle Vélez is listed as joint bronze medallist, but she finished fourth on countback.

Medal table

† Note: The medal table in the official 2010 report by RFEA incorrectly lists Argentina as having won a silver medal in the women's section. It also states that Venezuela gained one more men's bronze medal than it did (José Carabalí had the same 200 m time as the bronze medalist but was ranked fourth).

Participation
Of the twenty-eight member nations of the Asociación Iberoamericana de Atletismo twenty-one sent delegations to the competition. None of the six African members took part. All the original 22 founding member nations were present with the sole exception of Paraguay. A total of 312 athletes participated at the event.

 (15)
 (3)
 (71)
 (23)
 (13)
 (12)
 (16)
 (11)
 (11)
 (26)
 (7)
 (24)
 (2)
 (3)
 (1)
 (5)
 (19)
 (2)
 (22)
 (5)
 (21)

References

Results
El Atletismo Ibero-Americano - San Fernando 2010 (pgs. 171-180). RFEA. Retrieved on 2012-01-10.
Medalists. GBR Athletics. Retrieved on 2012-01-10.
Men's results
Women's results

Ibero-American Championships in Athletics
Ibero-American
Ibero-American Championships
International athletics competitions hosted by Guatemala
May 2002 sports events in North America